Montfort-en-Chalosse (literally Montfort in Chalosse) is a commune in the Landes department in Nouvelle-Aquitaine in southwestern France.

Population

Politics
Between 2001 and 2014, Françoise Dartigue-Peyrou was the mayor.

Christian Bouet was a town councillor until 2014. He had 7 terms for 43 years, a record in Montfort-en-Chalosse.

See also
Communes of the Landes department

References

Gallery

Communes of Landes (department)